Sarah (Sally) Pillsbury Harkness,  (July 8, 1914—May 22, 2013), was an American architect. She was a co-founder of The Architects Collaborative (TAC) in Cambridge, Massachusetts. She was one of two women among seven young architects who formed the firm with Walter Gropius in 1945. Harkness was an inspirational figure for women in architecture throughout her long career; early on she valued the idea of accessible design and sustainable practices in architecture. She gave voice to these ideals in 1985 as President of the Boston Society of Architects.

Early life and education 

Born Sarah Pillsbury in Swampscott, Massachusetts, but called "Sally", she was the daughter of Samuel Hale Pillsbury, a lawyer, and the former Helen Farrington Watters. 

She graduated from the Winsor School and then from the Cambridge School of Architecture and Landscape Architecture, which was affiliated with Smith College), with a master's degree in 1940. In 1941, she married John "Chip" Cheesman Harkness, also a co-founders of TAC, and they had seven children.

Career 
She is the author of Sustainable Design for Two Maine Islands, The Architects Collaborative Encyclopedia of Architecture, and co-edited The Architects Collaborative Inc., 1945 to 1965 with Walter Gropius. Her papers are stored at the International Archive of Women in Architecture.

She lived in Lexington, Massachusetts, at Six Moon Hill, a community dwelling designed by TAC. Harkness received a D.F.A. from Bates College in 1974.

Harkness was elected as fellow to the American Institute of Architects in 1979. Harkness was a registered architect in both Massachusetts and Tennessee. In 1981, she was a mentor of architect Cheryl L. McAfee.

"Still Standing: Conversations With Three Founding Partners of The Architects Collaborative" was a 2006 film documentary about The Architects Collaborative, and featured Harkness.

Work 

 Principal Designer of the Olin Arts Center and Ladd Library at Bates College in Lewiston, ME
 Anita Tuvin Schlechter Auditorium at Dickinson College in Carlisle, Pennsylvania 
 Art School Addition at the Worcester Art Museum in Worcester, Massachusetts 
 C. Thurston Chase Learning Center of the Eaglebrook School in Deerfield, Massachusetts 
 Co-Partner-in-Charge of Six Moon Hill Lexington, Massachusetts 
 Partner-in-Charge of Independent Study Unit (Carrel) for the Bedford Middle School in Mount Kisco, New York

Awards 

 1941 Prize, The Boston Society of Architects 
 1967 The design of the Fox Lane Middle School in Bedford, New York, The American Association of School Administrators Award 
 1967 Honor Award for the design of the Chase Learning Center of the Eaglebrook School in Deerfield, Massachusetts, The American Institute of Architects 
 1987 The design of the Olin Arts Center at Bates College, The American School and University of Louis I. Kahn Citation 
 1991 Award of Honor, The Boston Society of Architects

Independent Study Unit (Carrel) 
The goal of the Carrel was to provide each student with a study space and privacy. This space consisted of a study space, dining area and coat storage. The independent Study Units were designed for Bedford Middle School. When introducing the Study Unit to the school, a choice was made that two-thirds of the students would have a Carrel and one-third would not. This decision was made through the assumption that not all students would be ready for the independence that the Carrel provides. The Carrels were placed with the storage units, this allowed students to choose between working with their table-mate or independently. This was accomplished by opening the door on their storage unit. For students to be social for lunch, the tables were moved away from the storage units and combined together. This made enough room for six students to eat at the combined table. The arrangement incorporated the students who did not have a Carrel. The Carrels also had screens that could be used to divide the students into groups. All the students' belongings were in their Carrel, including coats which were hung on pegs at the end of the storage units.

Work and motherhood 
Sarah P. Harkness and Jean B. Fletcher were the only two female founding partners of TAC. They were both mothers, with Harkness having seven children and Fletcher having six. The women worked together to create a schedule that made it possible to work at the firm and to meet the responsibilities as mothers. The women worked half days; Fletcher would work in the morning and Harkness would work in the afternoon. The women also shared the same baby-sitter.

References 

1914 births
2013 deaths
20th-century American architects
20th-century American women artists
American women architects
Architects from Massachusetts
Architects from Cambridge, Massachusetts
People from Swampscott, Massachusetts
Smith College alumni
Fellows of the American Institute of Architects
21st-century American women